Manuela Haldner-Schierscher (born 26 June 1971) is a Free List politician from Liechtenstein and Member of the Landtag since 2021.

Biography
Haldner-Schierscher grew up in Schaan. She is a qualified social worker and works at the Liechtenstein probation service. From 2007 to 2015 she was a member of the Schaan municipal council. 

In the 2021 general election Haldner-Schierscher was elected in the Oberland constituency with 1,597 votes.  During the 2021-25 session she will serve on the foreign policy and judicial selection committees of the Landtag.

References

1971 births
Members of the Landtag of Liechtenstein
21st-century Liechtenstein politicians
Liechtenstein women in politics
Living people